Longview Power Plant is a coal-fired power plant located near Maidsville, West Virginia. The plant's single unit generates 700 megawatt (MW) of electricity from run-of-mine coal and natural gas.

History
The Longview Power project cost approximately $2.2 billion. After the plant began operation in 2011, construction defects and major changes in the power markets led to the company’s Chapter 11 bankruptcy in 2013. Longview attributed its need for bankruptcy “in large part because [Longview Power] has been plagued by design, construction, and equipment defects and failures …” In early 2015 the company reached a comprehensive settlement of all construction claims, and two of its major contractors agreed to remediate plant defects at their own expense. As a result, Longview Power emerged from bankruptcy in April 2015 with the full remediation of the plant underway and new ownership led by private equity firms including KKR, Centerbridge, Ascribe, and Third Avenue.

Longview were visited in 2016 by West Virginia Senators Joe Manchin and Shelley Moore Capito. Manchin stated the plant was an example of a cleaner future for coal-fired power. Ernest Moniz, United States Secretary of Energy, also visited the plant. His successor, Rick Perry, toured the plant in 2017. 

The plant previously relied on the Mepco coal mine in nearby Greene County, Pennsylvania, but it was shut down in March 2018 because of declining production and it was not competitive with larger mines in the area that could supply the plant.

In February 2019, Longview announced plans to add solar and natural gas generation to its state-of-the-art coal fire facilities. The combined-cycle natural gas facility would have a capacity of 1,200 MW, complementing the coal plant’s 700 MW. It would cost about $900 million to build and would be "a very modern advanced gas plant" next to "the cleanest coal plant in America." The 50 MW solar field will cost between $75 million and $80 million.

Environmental mitigation
Longview was constructed as a HELE, or high efficiency, low emissions plant. It has set industry standards for creating cleaner, more reliable power, its efficiency allowing more power to be created from less coal, and in consequence, less environmental impact, whether carbon dioxide, sulfur dioxide, nitrogen oxide, and particulate matter.

Longview is officially a "zero discharge" power plant in West Virginia. All sewage, stack blow-down and other liquid waste are piped to Pennsylvania, where it is discharged into the abandoned Shannopin Mine. The water is then treated and discharged into Dunkard Creek, according to a local environmental group’s website. 

Longview includes a new air pollution control system that results in emissions that are among the lowest in the nation for coal plants. In addition, Longview emits less  than most other coal plants because of its fuel efficiency.

SNL Financial reported in April 2016, on Longview’s 155 days of continuous operation during which it exceeded its operational metrics, with steady environmental performance and at an affordable cost.  Longview also used some of its fuel flexibility and took advantage of historically low natural gas prices and co-fired natural gas for up to 20% of unit heat input without any additional investment. Longview said its  emissions are about 15% below its peers and that it met its permit limitations despite having some of the most stringent in the nation.

See also
 Prairie State Energy Campus

References

Energy infrastructure completed in 2011
Coal-fired power stations in West Virginia
Buildings and structures in Monongalia County, West Virginia